At the Movies (also known as At the Movies with Gene Siskel and Roger Ebert) is an American movie review television program that aired from 1982 to 1990. It was produced by Tribune Entertainment and was created by Gene Siskel and Roger Ebert when they left their show Sneak Previews, which they began on Chicago's PBS station, WTTW, in 1975.

Background
For At the Movies, Siskel and Ebert adopted the same format they had used in their previous series, Sneak Previews: two critics from opposing newspapers view clips from the week's new movies, discuss them, then pass judgment expressed in thumbs up (to approve) or thumbs down (not worth seeing). During this run, they would adopt several elements that would make the show lively. For example, they would bring on an animal called "Spot the Wonder Dog" to help lead into a segment called "The Dog of the Week," covering the week's worst movie. Later, they used another animal, "Aroma the Educated Skunk." Siskel and Ebert would also occasionally feature an "X-Ray segment," in which they discussed current trends happening in the movies. None of these features were carried over when Siskel and Ebert left Tribune/PBS in 1986 over a contract dispute and created Siskel & Ebert & the Movies with Buena Vista Television, whose title was later shortened to simply Siskel & Ebert. (The show re-adopted the At the Movies portion of the title in 2007.)

They were replaced on At the Movies by film critics Rex Reed and Bill Harris, the latter a gossip correspondent for Entertainment Tonight (ET).  Under Reed and Harris, the show expanded beyond movie reviews, adding show business news and gossip.  Harris left in 1988 and was replaced by former ET host Dixie Whatley.

References

External links 
 

1982 American television series debuts
1990 American television series endings
English-language television shows
Film criticism television series
First-run syndicated television programs in the United States
Gene Siskel
Roger Ebert
Television series by Tribune Entertainment
Siskel and Ebert